Lionel Bah (born February 2, 1980 in Oullins, Rhône) is a former footballer. A midfielder, he played for Romanian club FC Astra Ploieşti and played for the Ivory Coast at international level, though born in France.

Career 
In March 2007, Bah received his first call-up for the Ivory Coast in an African Cup of Nations qualifier against Madagascar, a match played away.

After a successful trial with FC Astra Ploieşti in January 2009, Bah was signed to a six-month contract with FC Astra Ploieşti. In June 2009, he helped FC Astra Ploieşti gain promotion to in Romanian Premier League.

References

External links

1980 births
Living people
People from Oullins
Citizens of Ivory Coast through descent
Ivorian footballers
French footballers
Ivory Coast international footballers
French sportspeople of Ivorian descent
Louhans-Cuiseaux FC players
En Avant Guingamp players
Stade de Reims players
US Créteil-Lusitanos players
US Boulogne players
APOP Kinyras FC players
FC Astra Giurgiu players
Ivorian expatriate footballers
Expatriate footballers in Romania
Expatriate footballers in Cyprus
Ligue 1 players
Ligue 2 players
Cypriot First Division players
Association football midfielders
Sportspeople from Lyon Metropolis
Footballers from Auvergne-Rhône-Alpes